The Potter Valley Project is an hydroelectric project in Northern California in the United States, delivering water from the Eel River basin to turbines in the headwaters of the Russian River. The project is owned and operated by Pacific Gas and Electric Company (PG&E). The main facilities are two dams on the Eel River, a diversion tunnel and hydroelectric plant.

History
Construction on the project began in 1900, when The Eel River Power and Irrigation Company (later the Snow Mountain Water and Power Company) constructed the Cape Horn Dam and a one-mile (1.6 km), -diameter tunnel under the drainage divide to Potter Valley, at the headwaters of the East Fork Russian River. The water dropped  to a powerhouse before being released to the East Fork Russian River. On April 1, 1908, the first deliveries were made and power production began with a capacity of 4000 kilowatts (KW). In 1910, the generation capacity was boosted to 7000 KW and in 1912 second penstock was built to increase the flow capacity of the tunnel. The powerhouse was upgraded to 9400 KW in 1917, after the addition of a fourth unit.

Initially, the project could only operate during the winter months, when there was enough water in the Eel River to divert without drying up the riverbed downstream. Scott Dam, which forms Lake Pillsbury, was completed in 1922. With its greater storage capacity, it provides water for the diversion during the summer months and also affords some flood control during winter storms. In 1930, ownership of the project was transferred to PG&E. In 1959, Coyote Valley Dam was built on the Russian River as part of the separate Russian River Basin Project (RRBP), forming Lake Mendocino, which provides additional storage of diverted Eel River waters. This reservoir serves a critical function during dry years as it is drawn down to compensate for reduced diversions from the Eel River system.

The Federal Energy Regulatory Commission relicensing of the project on January 28, 2004, placed limits on the amount of water than can be diverted. In combination with drought conditions, diversions between 2004 and 2009 averaged , or 57% of the historical average. Since then, late summer water has been released from Cape Horn Dam at rates roughly mimicking or exceeding natural flows in an attempt to mitigate the impacts to fisheries.

Operations
The vast majority of the water arrives as winter rain between December and April, with a smaller, less reliable amount furnished by snowmelt and groundwater through June. Project regulations require that the gates at Scott Dam be opened between October 16 and April 1, for safety reasons during the winter months. It is not uncommon for the dams to spill eight or nine times during a single winter season. After the wet season passes, Lake Pillsbury is drawn down beginning April 1. Typical summer drawdowns leave the reservoir at or above , or 27 percent capacity. Water is released to Cape Horn Dam, which diverts the majority, while releasing a small flow to the Eel River designed to mimic natural summer flows.

Beneficiaries
In 1924, the Potter Valley Irrigation District (PVID) was formed to provide irrigation water to the farmers along the East Branch Russian River. Because there is very little natural runoff in Potter Valley and the local geology is non-conducive to groundwater storage, the PVID is the only constituent that depends solely on Eel River water.

Project water also serves farmers and municipalities downstream along the Russian River, in Mendocino County. These users depend both on Potter Valley Project water and natural flows in the Russian River basin managed by the RRBP. Project water is estimated to provide at least part of the water supply for nearly 500,000 people living in Sonoma and Mendocino Counties, mainly in the North Bay area, for cities such as Santa Rosa.

Environmental impact
The Potter Valley Project has had a significant impact on summer low streamflows in the Eel River basin. Although the project taps water from only the upper 10% of the Eel River system, this headwaters region provides most of the summer flow in the lower Eel, especially during critically dry years, when only  are allowed into the Eel River past the Cape Horn diversion point. As a result, summer-run salmon and steelhead in the Eel River are negatively affected during dry years.

See also

Water in California

References

External links

Water supply infrastructure in California
Interbasin transfer
Hydroelectric power plants in California
Geography of Mendocino County, California
Geography of Sonoma County, California
Eel River (California)
Russian River (California)